Robert Vance Isaac (August 1, 1932 – August 14, 1977) was an American stock car racing driver. Isaac made his first NASCAR appearance in 1961, and quickly forged a reputation of one of the toughest competitors of the 1960s and 1970s. He was most famously associated with driving Nord Krauskopf's red No. 71 K&K Insurance Dodge Charger. Isaac was NASCAR's Grand National Series champion in 1970. Isaac abruptly retired from full-time top-level competition in 1973 and died of a heart attack during a late model race at Hickory Motor Speedway in 1977. For his achievements, Isaac was named as one of NASCAR's 50 Greatest Drivers and inducted into the NASCAR Hall of Fame.

Early life
Isaac grew up on a farm near Catawba, North Carolina, the second-youngest of nine children.  He finished school after the sixth grade, which led to the incorrect rumor that he could neither read nor write.

NASCAR career

He began racing full-time in 1956, but it took him seven years to break into the Grand National division.  Isaac won the championship in 1970 driving the No. 71 Dodge Charger Daytona sponsored by K&K Insurance.  His crew chief was Harry Hyde.  Isaac and Hyde took the car to Talladega in November and set a closed-course speed record.

Isaac won 37 races in NASCAR's top series during his career, including 11 in his championship season, and started from the pole position 49 times.  Isaac currently holds the NASCAR record for most poles in a single season, with 20 in 1969.  In 1970 he turned a 201.104 mph lap at Talladega, a record that stood until 1983.

Isaac dropped out of the 1973 Talladega 500 mid-race in an impulsive decision which surprised his pit crew and the team owner.  "I wasn't afraid I was going to wreck...I don't have anything to prove to myself or to anybody else.  I know how it feels to win and lose.  I know how it feels to be a champion.  And now I know how it feels to quit.  It just entered my mind at that moment," Isaac said.  "I decided to quit and that was that.  (Team owner) Bud Moore didn't know I had quit until after the race.  I didn't know about (Larry) Smith at that time."  (Larry Smith was the first fatality at Talladega Superspeedway, which happened earlier in the race).  Isaac did not participate in any further 1973 NASCAR Winston Cup races after Talladega, and the presumption by sports commentators in late 1973 was that he was retiring from the sport.

Ultimately, Isaac did return to NASCAR racing as a driver from 1974 through 1976, on a reduced schedule.

Land speed records
Isaac also made his mark outside of NASCAR.  In September 1971, he went to the Bonneville Salt Flats in Utah and set 28 world speed records, some of which still stand.

Awards
Bobby Isaac was inducted into the National Motorsports Press Association Hall of Fame in 1979, and the International Motorsports Hall of Fame in 1996.  In 1998 NASCAR honored Isaac as one of its 50 greatest drivers.  On May 20, 2015, Isaac was announced as a member of the 2016 induction class to the NASCAR Hall of Fame.

Death
On Saturday night, August 13, 1977, while running fourth, Isaac pulled out of the Winston 200 late model sportsman race at Hickory Motor Speedway with 40 laps left, and called for a relief driver, collapsing on pit road of heat exhaustion. Though Isaac was revived briefly at the hospital and was conversing with friends, he later died from a heart attack caused by heat exhaustion, at 12:45 a.m On August 14, 1977, 13 days after his 45th birthday.

Details of Isaac's pit lane collapse on the night of his death were given to reporters by friend and former racing driver Ned Jarrett.  Jarrett asserted at that time that the reason Isaac left the 1973 Talladega 500 was because he "had heard a voice that told him to quit".

Motorsports career results

NASCAR
(key) (Bold – Pole position awarded by qualifying time. Italics – Pole position earned by points standings or practice time. * – Most laps led.)

Grand National Series

Winston Cup Series

Daytona 500

References

External links
 
Biography, part 1
Biography, part 2
Bobby Isaac: NASCAR's First Modern Champion

1932 births
1977 deaths
People from Catawba, North Carolina
Racing drivers from North Carolina
Land speed record people
NASCAR drivers
NASCAR Cup Series champions
International Motorsports Hall of Fame inductees
USAC Stock Car drivers
NASCAR Hall of Fame inductees
Racing drivers who died while racing